Let Me Entertain You is a British entertainment-based television series for ITV. It ran from 26 April to 7 June 2014 and is presented by Michael Underwood.

Format
Each episode of the show is recorded late in the week (usually Fridays) to be broadcast on the Saturday evening. This allows viewers to send in videos that the show require during the working week.

External links

2014 British television series debuts
2014 British television series endings
ITV (TV network) original programming
Television series by STV Studios